Bihar Assembly elections were held twice in the year 2005. There was a fractured verdict in February 2005 Assembly Election. Since no government could be formed in Bihar, fresh elections were held in October–November the same year.

Schedule

Result
Source: ECI

Elected members

See also 
 October 2005 Bihar Legislative Assembly election
 2000 Bihar Legislative Assembly election
 Elections in Bihar
 Politics in Bihar

References 

State Assembly elections in Bihar
2000s in Bihar
Bihar
February 2005 events in India